Xanthothecium is a genus of fungi within the Onygenaceae family. This is a monotypic genus, containing the single species Xanthothecium peruvianum.

References

External links
 

Onygenales
Taxa described in 1973
Monotypic Eurotiomycetes genera